The 2012 French Athletics Championships was the 124th edition of the national championship in outdoor track and field for France. It was held on 15–17 June at the Stade du Lac de Maine in Angers. A total of 38 events (divided evenly between the sexes) were contested over the three-day competition.

Results

Men

Women

References

Results
 Results. Fédération française d'athlétisme 

French Athletics Championships
French Athletics Championships
French Athletics Championships
French Athletics Championships
Sport in Angers